Howard J. Earl (February 27, 1869 – December 22, 1916), nicknamed "Slim Jim", was a Major League Baseball outfielder.

From  onward, he served as player-manager at each stop. During the latter part of his career he shifted from the outfield to first base.

External links

Major League Baseball outfielders
Chicago Colts players
Milwaukee Brewers (AA) players
Boston Blues players
Salem Witches players
Milwaukee Brewers (minor league) players
Milwaukee Creams players
Minneapolis Millers (baseball) players
Oshkosh Indians players
Oakland Colonels players
Detroit Creams players
Wilkes-Barre Coal Barons players
Syracuse Stars (minor league baseball) players
Utica Pent Ups players
Utica Reds players
Schenectady Electricians players
Ilion Typewriters players
Amsterdam-Gloversville-Johnstown Hyphens players
Amsterdam-Gloversville-Johnstown Jags players
Baseball players from Massachusetts
1869 births
1916 deaths
19th-century baseball players